Pierre Trémaux (20 July 1818 – 12 March 1895) was a French architect, Orientalist photographer and author of numerous scientific and ethnographic publications.

Life and career
Very little is known about Pierre Trémaux's life. He was born in Charrecey, France, into a family of modest means. He was the son of Jean-Marie Trémaux, a farmer and Claudine Renaudin, and had at least two sisters. Details of his final years are very sketchy and no details of his death and final resting place are known.

Trémaux distinguished himself in many fields. He entered the École des Beaux-Arts in 1840 and received the second Prix de Rome in Architecture in 1845. As a trained architect, he worked at the Schneider establishments in Le Creusot. He was interested in urbanism and the construction of the Suez Canal in Egypt. 

Interested in natural history, he traveled to Algeria, Tunisia, Upper Egypt, Sudan and Ethiopia in 1847–1848, where he made many drawings and was one of the first persons to produce photographic images of these regions. From Alexandria, he traveled up the Nile to Nubia. In 1853–1854, he undertook a second photographic trip to Libya, Egypt, Asia Minor, Tunisia, Syria and Greece. Having spent seven years in the region, he returned from these trips with many illustrations and photographic images, some of the first photographs ever made of the region and its people.

Work

Photography
With 21 photographs and 56 lithographs made after his photos, relatively few have survived, and their condition is poor. According to Chief Curator of Photography at the Israel Museum, Nissan N. Perez, his photographs "reveal that Trémaux had an interest in anthropological photography, and, had he succeeded, it might have been a most important survey of Oriental types and customs, and not, as it is today, a mere gallery of curiosities."

Nevertheless, his published works, such as the Voyages series of 1852 to 1862, were the first books on Egypt, Sudan, Palestine and other Middle Eastern regions with illustrations based on photographs by the author.

Theory of evolution
Trémaux is also the author of a work that caused a sensation at the 1867 Universal Exhibition in Paris: Origine et transformations de l'homme et des autres êtres  (translated as Origin and transformations of Man and other beings), 1865. In this book he proposed, for the first time in history, the evolutionary theory that today is referred to as the theory of punctuated equilibria.

Publications

Between 1852 and 1868, Trémaux produced a number of distinct groups of photographic plates to accompany texts on the geography, architecture, and people of regions in Africa and Asia Minor. Produced with the support of the French government, these high quality publications combined an array of graphic techniques in ways that had not previously been attempted. His surviving images are salted paper prints, engravings, tinted and colour lithographs and photolithographs.

Articles
 "Notice d’un voyage sur le cours du Nil et dans des parties inconnues du Soudan, chez les nègres Bertha, du Darfok et du Dar-Gourum," Bulletin de la Société de Géographie, 1849, sèr., 12 pp 67–72
 "Notes sur la localité ou sont situées les principales mines d’or du Soudan oriental, et observations critiques sur le récit du Colonel Kovalevski relatif à cette même contrée." Bulletin de la Société de Géographie, 1850, sér. 13 (73–78)
 "Quelques détails sur les prétendus hommes à queue," Bulletin de la Société de Géographie, 1855, 4e sér., 9 (49–54), p. 139-148
 "Épisode d’un voyage au Soudan oriental et remarques sur l’esclavage," Bulletin de la Société de Géographie, 1856, 4e sér., 11 (61–66), p. 153-164
 "Remarques sur l’Afrique centrale et orientale," Bulletin de la Société de Géographie, 1862, 5e sér., 3 (13–18), p. 69-86 et 147–165

Books
 Parallèle des édifices anciens et modernes du continent africain, illustré de 82 planches et une carte de l'Afrique Centrale, 1858
 Dessinés et relevés de 1847 à 1854 dans l'Algerie, les régences de Tunis et de Tripoli, l'Égypte, la Nubie, les déserts, l'île de Méroé, le Sennar, le Fa-Zogle, etc.
  Exploration archéologique en Asie mineure, illustré de 92 planches, 1864
 Voyage en Éthiopie, au Soudan Oriental et dans la Nigritie, atlas illustré de 61 planches, Hachette, 1852
 Voyage en Éthiopie, au Soudan Oriental et dans la Nigritie, Vol 1: Égypte et Éthiopie, textes de l'Atlas, Hachette, 1862
 Voyage en Éthiopie, au Soudan Oriental et dans la Nigritie, Vol. 2: Le Soudan, textes de l'Atlas, Hachette, 1862.
 Origine et transformations de l'homme et des autres êtres, Hachette, 1865
 Principe universel de la vie, de tout mouvement et de l'état de la matière,  Chez l'auteur, 1868, 1874, 1876 
 Origine des espèces et de l'homme avec les causes de fixité et de transformation et principe universel du mouvement et de la vie ou loi des transmissions de force, 1898

See also
 Architectural photography
 Architectural photographers
 History of Photography
 Orientalism
 Punctuated equilibrium

References 

This article includes material translated from the French Wikipedia, :fr:Pierre Trémaux

Bibliography 

 Pierre Trémaux, in François Pouillon (ed.), Dictionnaire des orientalistes de langue française, Paris, IISMM & Karthala, 2008, pp. 940 – 941, 
 "Comptes-rendus de la Société de Géographie à Paris de 1850 à 1897" (online on Gallica).
 Nicolas Le Guern, "L'Égypte et ses premiers photographes : étude des différentes techniques et du matériel utilisés de 1839 à 1869", 2001

External links 

Origine et transformations de l'homme et des autres êtres (Hachette, 1865) available on Google books

1818 births
1895 deaths
19th-century French architects
19th-century French photographers
Architectural photographers
Chevaliers of the Légion d'honneur
French ethnographers
French orientalists
Landscape photographers
People from Saône-et-Loire
Pioneers of photography
Prix de Rome for architecture
Proto-evolutionary biologists
Punctuated equilibrium
Expatriate photographers in Sudan
Expatriate photographers in Egypt